The genus, Pterolobium (from Gr. πτερόν pterón, meaning "wing", and λόβιον lóbion, meaning "pod" or "capsule", alluding to the winged fruit), consists of 10 species of perennial flowering plants in the family Fabaceae, subfamily Caesalpinioideae and tribe Caesalpinieae.  They are sometimes called redwings and are native to the tropical to subtropical climes of Africa and Asia, including Indonesia and the Philippines. They are large scrambling or climbing shrubs that grow in riverside thickets, on rocky slopes or at forest margins. They bear colourful samara fruit, and have pairs of thorns below the rachis of their bipinnate leaves.

Species
Pterolobium comprises the following species:
 Pterolobium borneense Merrill
 Pterolobium densiflorum Prain
 Pterolobium hexapetalum (Roth) Santapau & Wagh ― camp siege
 Pterolobium integrum Craib
 Pterolobium macropterum Kurz (synonym P. sinense)
 Pterolobium membranulaceum (Blanco) Merrill
 Pterolobium micranthum Gagnep., emend. Craib
 Pterolobium microphyllum Miq.
 Pterolobium punctatum Hemsl.
 Pterolobium stellatum (Forssk.) Brenan ― redwing (synonym P. lacerans)

References

External links

 Authors and publications: Pterolobium, International plant names index

 
Fabaceae genera